Badminton tournaments were held for the sixth time at the 9th Asian Games in 1982 in New Delhi, India from 25 November to 3 December.

There were 7 events contested including singles, doubles, and team events for both men and women, as well as mixed doubles.

Medalists

Medal table

Semifinal results

Final results

References

External links
 Results

 
1982 Asian Games events
1982
Asian Games
1982 Asian Games